Community displacement is the movement of a population out of a neighborhood as formal or informal redevelopment occurs.   It may be a result of gentrification, the informal redevelopment that occurs when new, and typically richer people, move into a neighborhood. It is the result of urban redevelopment of a residential neighborhood to non-residential uses including retail, education, healthcare, and transportation.  It is often criticized because the current residents have limited options to buy or rent equivalent housing in alternative areas at the same price.  If they stay, prices for products, services, and taxes in the local area rise and existing social networks are disturbed.

Origin of the term

The 1949 Housing Act described the movement of populations out of blighted areas as planned shrinkage. The academic literature describes this movement as serial displacement. Recently, the terms urban displacement and community displacement are used commonly.

What community displacement is not

Community displacement is not gentrification. It may be a byproduct, but it is not a necessary result of gentrification. New York City's gentrification of the financial district produced no outflow of population.  It did not significantly change the cost of living in the neighborhood.

Economist Lance Freeman came to this conclusion: "displacement and higher mobility play minor if any roles as forces of change in gentrifying neighborhoods."

Community displacement is not white flight—when residents voluntarily move away.

What community displacement is

Community displacement is the movement of a population out of a neighborhood as formal or informal redevelopment occurs. The predominant generator of population displacement is government sponsored projects: new highways, education campuses, hospitals, and other urban renewal projects.  Housing projects may displace people temporarily.  In the 1960s, the preference was for high-density projects which did not result in net displacement.  Low-density projects may or may not cause a net displacement.

Community displacement is used to describe movement in urban areas.  A related term, Development-induced displacement, typically describes movement connected with rural projects, such as dam projects.

Community displacement is a key argument against informal and formal urban renewal projects.  The implication is that the benefits calculus undervalues the interests of the community residents who will be displaced.

References

 
Urban economics
Urban renewal
Urban studies and planning terminology